= 1950 Liechtenstein weapons law referendum =

- 12 March 1950
- Referendum on a new weapons law

Results
Choice	Votes	%
Yes	667	27.72%
No	1,739	72.28%
Valid votes	2,406	91.00%
Invalid or blank votes	238	9.00%
Total votes	2,644	100.00%
Registered voters/turnout	3,265	80.98%

A referendum on a new weapons law was held in Liechtenstein on 12 March 1950. The law had been passed by the Landtag, but was rejected by 72.3% of voters.

== Results ==
Choice	Votes	%
For	667	27.7
Against	1,739	72.3
Invalid/blank votes	238	–
Total	2,644	100
Registered voters/turnout	3,265	81.0
Source: Nohlen & Stöver
